The Internationalist Democratic Party is a political party in the Republic of India, working in Jammu & Kashmir, Punjab and Rajasthan. The IDP was founded by R.P. Saraf, a former communist leader in 1986.

The national president of the IDP was Master Kheta Singh and general Secretary Hoshiar Singh from Samba district (J&K). Hoshiar Singh and his wife Smt. Sashi Bala were gunned down by unknown militants at 11 May 2008 in their Samba residence.

The IDP favours politics of peace. The party also favours joint Indo-Pakistani control over Kashmir as a means to achieve peace. The party also favours increased autonomy for the Jammu and Ladakh regions.

The present president of IDP is I.D. Khajuria and general secretary is S. Karnail Singh Jakhepal.

Political parties in Jammu and Kashmir
Political parties established in 1986
1986 establishments in Jammu and Kashmir